Boston and Worcester Electric Companies (B&W) was a holding company for several streetcar companies between Boston and Worcester, Massachusetts. The main line, built by the Boston and Worcester Street Railway, was an interurban streetcar line partly on the old Boston and Worcester Turnpike (now Route 9) and partly on private right-of-way. Long after the line was converted to buses, Boston and Worcester Lines took over operations, and sold the franchises to various other bus companies.

In Newton, the B&W was granted a franchise in exchange for constructing a 90-foot (27 m) wide boulevard, of which it ran down the median. The B&W also carried freight.

History

The Boston and Worcester Street Railway was chartered November 16, 1901. Service between Boston and Framingham Junction began on May 5, 1903. (The line operated over the Boston Elevated Railway in Brookline and Boston; these trackage rights had been granted in December 1900 after a brief controversy.) Service between Worcester and Chestnut Hill began on July 1, 1903; Worcester–Boston service began five days later. Running time between the terminal was two hours and fifteen minutes; this was slower than Boston and Albany Railroad trains, but the B&W cost 40 cents versus the railroad's one-dollar fare. Service operated every half-hour, with short turn cars providing fifteen-minute frequency east of Framingham.

Boston and Worcester Electric Companies was incorporated December 29, 1902 to serve as a holding company. The B&W arranged control of several connecting roads in 1899 and purchased them in 1903–04: 
The Framingham Union Street Railway ran local service within Framingham. It operated a Framingham Center–South Framingham that connected to the B&W mainline at the former point, and a Saxonville–South Framingham line that intersected the B&W at Framingham Junction.
The Framingham, Southborough and Marlborough Street Railway and its subsidiary Marlborough and Framingham Street Railway operated a line between Hudson and Framingham Center via Marlborough and Southborough. The B&W used this line between Fayville and Framingham Center.
The B&W opened a short branch to Natick Center in 1909.

In 1925–26, the B&W attempted to replace its entire service with buses, but was rebuffed by Brookline. However, the Framingham–Framingham Centre and Framingham Junction–Saxonville routes were replaced by buses on June 13, 1925. On July 3, 1926, the B&W began operating a Boston–Worcester bus line that followed the turnpike west of Shrewsbury, and the Post Road east of Northborough. The Hudson branch was replaced by buses in April 1928, followed by the Natick branch on October 15. Framingham Junction–Framingham service ended in September 1930. The line was cut back to Framingham on January 15, 1931, as paving of the turnpike progressed eastward, with buses replacing the western half. On June 11, 1932, the eastern half of the line was replaced with buses as well.

Lines

The main line ran along the old Boston and Worcester Turnpike (Route 9) except in the following places:
In Worcester, the tracks used Shrewsbury Street to get downtown.
Just east of the bridge over Lake Quinsigamond, the tracks split.  One pair followed the south-east shore of the lake along a private right-of-way to a dead end. The main tracks ran slightly south of Route 9 until they crossed the turnpike at South Shrewsbury (the bridge on route 9 carries traffic over the former alignment) and then continued on the north side until they merged with the turnpike at the Northborough/Westborough border.
North of Westborough center, at the crossing with current Route 135, the tracks split to the south (behind the former Bergson's 1790 House), rejoining the turnpike at Breakneck Hill Road (just east of Route 85) in Southborough. Breakneck Hill Road is where the older tracks of the Framingham, Southboro and Marlborough Street Railway split to head north to Marlborough and Hudson.
At the Boston end, the line ran to the end of Huntington Avenue, the old turnpike, and continued on to Park Square.
The section in Worcester was on trackage rights from the Worcester Consolidated Street Railway (on their "City Hall and Lake" line), and in Boston it used the tracks of the Boston Elevated Railway.

At Framingham Junction, the crossing with current Route 126 in Framingham, many cars from Boston turned south to end at downtown Framingham ("South Framingham"). This junction was at the crossing of the older Framingham Union Street Railway line to Saxonville.

The other lines were as follows:
Splitting from the main line at Fayville (Breakneck Hill Road) and heading north via Southborough and Marlborough to Hudson, originally owned by the Framingham, Southboro and Marlborough Street Railway (along with the main line east to Framingham Center).
Downtown Framingham northeast to Saxonville, roughly if not fully via current Route 126. This was originally owned by the Framingham Union Street Railway, and crossed the main line at Framingham Junction.
Downtown Framingham northwest to Framingham Center via Union Avenue, originally part of the Framingham Union Street Railway. Before the consolidation into the B&W, an interchange with the Framingham, Southboro and Marlborough Street Railway existed at Framingham Center.
Other local routes may have existed.

The following interchange points with other companies were provided:
Worcester Consolidated Street Railway in Worcester
Worcester Consolidated Street Railway (originally Worcester and Marlborough Street Railway) just east of Worcester
Worcester Consolidated Street Railway (originally Worcester and Marlborough Street Railway) at Wessonville (current Route 135)
Marlborough and Westborough Street Railway east of Wessonville
Worcester Consolidated Street Railway (originally Clinton and Hudson Street Railway) at Hudson
Concord, Maynard and Hudson Street Railway at Hudson
Worcester Consolidated Street Railway (originally Worcester and Marlborough Street Railway) at Marlborough
Marlborough and Westborough Street Railway at Marlborough
Middlesex and Boston Street Railway (originally South Middlesex Street Railway) at South Framingham
Milford and Uxbridge Street Railway (originally Milford, Holliston and Framingham Street Railway) at South Framingham
Middlesex and Boston Street Railway (originally Natick and Cochituate Street Railway) at Saxonville, Felchville, and Wellesley Hills 
Middlesex and Boston Street Railway (originally Newton and Boston Street Railway) at Newton Upper Falls
Boston Elevated Railway in Brookline and Boston

References

Railroad History Database
Changes to Transit Service in the MBTA district (PDF)
Transit Systems in Massachusetts
Kenneth W. Newcomb, The Makers of the Mold

Streetcars in the Boston area
Framingham, Massachusetts
Interurban railways in Massachusetts
Defunct Massachusetts railroads